James Cullinan (1942 – 11 February 2020) was an Irish hurler who played for Clare Senior Championship clubs Newmarket-on-Fergus and Éire Óg. He played for the Clare senior hurling team for 15 seasons, during which time he usually lined out as a centre-back.

Honours

Newmarket-on-Fergus
Munster Senior Club Hurling Championship (1): 1967 (c)

Clare
National Hurling League (1): 1976-77

Munster
Railway Cup (4): 1963, 1968, 1969, 1970

References

1942 births
2020 deaths
Newmarket-on-Fergus hurlers
Clare inter-county hurlers
Munster hurlers
Hurling selectors